St. George is a 6th-century Armenian church located at the outskirts of Sverdlov village, Armenia. 

The church has underrun reconstruction in 19th century and by 2010. The recent reconsecration took place on 19 June 2010 under leadership of Bishop Sebouh Chouldjian, primate of the Diocese of Gougark.

Gallery

References 
  Google Translation

Armenian Apostolic churches in Armenia
Buildings and structures in Lori Province
6th-century churches